Gastromermis is a genus of nematodes belonging to the family Mermithidae.

Species:
 Gastromermis abaquatilis Rubzov & Gafurov, 1977 
 Gastromermis acroamphidis Steiner, 1929

References

Mermithidae